The Third Rail (sometimes also referred to as Third Rail) is the fourth and final studio album by New York City-based blues rock band Railroad Jerk, released on October 8, 1996 on Matador Records.

Critical reception

Chris Nelson, of Addicted to Noise, ranked The Third Rail as his fourth favorite album of 1996. Writing in the Village Voice, Robert Christgau gave the album a B+ grade, writing that on it, the band's frontman Marcellus Hall "...represents Manhattan art-slackerdom like the proud denizen he is." AllMusic's Stephen Thomas Erlewine gave the album 4 out of 5 stars, writing that "...much of the album rocks harder and better than any of their previous records."

Track listing
	Clean Shirt	– 4:07
	Objectify Me – 3:11
	You Forgot – 3:48
	Natalie – 4:20
	You Bet – 4:32
	Well – 4:45
	Dusty Knuckle – 4:01
	Middle Child – 3:13
	This Is Not To Say I Still Miss You – 3:14
 	Another Nite At The Bar – 2:54
	(I Can't Get) No Sleep – 3:47
	Sweet Librarian – 1:57
	Untitled – 0:33

References

1996 albums
Railroad Jerk albums
Matador Records albums